Arctostaphylos ohloneana is a rare species of manzanita known by the common name Ohlone manzanita in the Santa Cruz Mountains in California. It is endemic to northwest Santa Cruz County, where it is known only from four populations on Ben Lomond Mountain, just south of Big Basin Redwoods State Park.

It was discovered in the 1980s among other manzanita species on the mountain and it was described to science in 2008. There are an estimated 100 individuals in existence.

Distribution
Arctostaphylos ohloneana occurs in maritime chaparral and oak and pine forest habitat on whitish soils of siliceous shale origin. The plants all occur on land owned by Lockheed Martin.

Description
Arctostaphylos ohloneana is an erect, bushy shrub reaching one or two meters in height.  The branches are covered in reddish-brown bark and the newer twigs have fuzzy hairs. The light green leaves have oval blades up to 3 centimeters long by 1.5 wide. The inflorescence is a panicle of white or pinkish conical or urn-shaped flowers. The fruit is a spherical reddish-brown drupe 5 to 8 millimeters wide.

References

External links
 Jepson Manual Treatment - Arctostaphylos ohloneana
 Flora of North America: Arctostaphylos ohloneana

ohloneana
Endemic flora of California
Natural history of the California chaparral and woodlands
Natural history of the California Coast Ranges
Natural history of Santa Cruz County, California
Plants described in 2008
Critically endangered flora of California